The Patriot League Men's Basketball Player of the Year is a basketball award given to the Patriot League's most outstanding player. The award was first given following the 1990–91 season, the first under the Patriot League name and also the league's first season as an all-sports conference. There have been five repeat winners of the award: Adonal Foyle of Colgate (1996, 1997), Brian Ehlers of Lafayette (1999, 2000), CJ McCollum of Lehigh (2010, 2012), Mike Muscala of Bucknell (2011, 2013), and Tim Kempton Jr. of Lehigh (2015, 2016). Bucknell claims the most awards (8) while Colgate is second with six. Bucknell has the most individual players honored with seven.

Two Patriot League members have not had a winner: Army and Loyola Maryland. No ties have ever occurred for the player of the year award.

Key

Winners

Winners by school

Footnotes
  Fordham and Army were not charter members of the conference when it was established as the football-only Colonial League in 1986. They became members in 1990 when the conference became an all-sports league (and also adopted its current name).
  Fordham left for the Atlantic 10 Conference in 1995. They are still a Patriot League associate member in football.

References

External links
 .

NCAA Division I men's basketball conference players of the year

Awards established in 1991
1991 establishments in the United States